Mandkola is a village and Gram panchayat located in Hathin Tehsil of Palwal district, Haryana, India. The Village is situated 14km away from sub-district headquarter Hathin and 15km away from district headquarter Palwal.

References

Villages in Palwal district